A tab stop on a typewriter is a location where the carriage movement is halted by an adjustable end stop. Tab stops are set manually, and pressing the tab key causes the carriage to go to the next tab stop. In text editors on a computer, the same concept is implemented simplistically with automatic, fixed tab stops.

Modern word processors generalize this concept by offering tab stops that have an alignment attribute and cause the text to be automatically aligned at left, at right or center of the tab stop itself. Such tab stops are paragraph-specific properties and can be moved to a different location in any moment, or even removed.

Sometimes, placeholders in code snippets are also called "tab stops" because the user can cycle through them by pressing the tab key.

Types of tab stops 
A tab stop is a horizontal position which is set for placing and aligning text on a page. There are at least five kinds of tab stops in general usage in word processing or in Microsoft Word.

Left text extends to the right from the tab stop.
Center  text is centered at the tab stop.
Right text extends to the left from the tab stop until the tab's space is filled, and then  the text extends to the right.
Decimal text before the decimal point extends to the left, and text after the decimal point extends to the right.
Bar a vertical line at the specified position on each line in a document.

Dynamic tab stops 
In contrast to fixed positioning, tab stops can be adjusted dynamically, based on the length of adjacent tab-delimited line segments, by alignment to a specific character or string in each line, etc. Adobe InDesign supports a non-printing "indent to here" character.

In 2007, Nick Gravgaard published an algorithm for automatic dynamic tab stops called "Elastic tabstops". This can be useful for viewing/editing source code and essential for tabular data. Various text editors and IDEs have implemented the elastic tabstops algorithm either directly or by extension.

Software which supports elastic tabstops 
 Visual Studio
 Atom
 Textadept
 Code Browser
 JEdit
 Notepad++
 Go tabwriter package
 Rust tabwriter crate

See also 
 Typographic alignment for an application
 Table (information) for another application

References 

Typewriters
Typography
User interface techniques